The azure damselfly (Coenagrion puella) is a species of damselfly found in most of Europe. It is notable for its distinctive black and blue colouring.
They are commonly found around ponds and lakesides during the summer.

Morphology

Adults

Males

Adult male azure damselflies have a head and thorax patterned with blue and black. They have an azure blue abdomen patterned with black markings. The marking on the second segment of the abdomen is U-shaped, separated from the segment's narrow terminal black band. (This distinguishes it from the variable damselfly where the U-shape is joined to the terminal band with a black line.)

Segments three to five are blue with broader black terminal bands, lacking the forward-pointing projection the upper surface which adult male common blue damselfly has. Segment six has a similar pattern but with more restricted blue and a broader area of black, and segment seven is mostly black, with just a narrow blue area at the base. Segment eight and much of segment nine are sky-blue, forming a noticeable contrasting patch, but there are small dark markings on the rear upper side of segment nine, which adult male common blue damselfly does not possess.

Females

Adult female azure damselflies have a head and thorax pattern similar to that of the male, but with glittering, glossy green replacing the blue coloring. The abdominal segments are largely black in coloring, with narrow pale markings at the junction between each segment.

Nymphs

The nymphs are usually green with browner wing buds and lamellae. They develop in one year (two in the north), feeding among submerged vegetation and on small invertebrates.

Behaviour

Mature adults are seen frequently mating and laying eggs. It usually stays close to the vegetation around the pond or lake and flies from May to September.

This common damselfly looks very like a common blue damselfly. The behaviour is also different - unlike common blues, they rarely fly out over large stretches of water. They are not normally as common around August and September, June and July being the peak of their populations.

References

External links
 
 
 Coenagrion puella - Azure damselfly
 Azure damselfly (Coenagrion puella)

Coenagrionidae
Damselflies of Europe
Damselflies described in 1758
Taxa named by Carl Linnaeus
Articles containing video clips